Alexandru Marin (born March 29, 1992) is a Romanian professional boxer fighting out of Bethesda, Maryland, United States.

As of June 2019, he is ranked as the world's third best active super flyweight by IBF, and fourth by WBO.

On December 16, 2019, Gideon Buthelezi should have defended his IBO super flyweight title against Marin, who was IBO mandatory challenger. The match did not take place because Marin cited poor health.

Professional boxing record

References

External links 

 
Romanian male boxers 
Super-flyweight boxers
Bantamweight boxers
1992 births 
Living people 
Sportspeople from Iași
Boxers at the 2010 Summer Youth Olympics